The 1948 Albanian National Championship was the eleventh season of the Albanian National Championship, the top professional league for association football clubs, since its establishment in 1930.

Overview
It was contested by 14 teams, and Partizani won the championship.

Regular season

Group A

Note: '17 Nëntori' is SK Tirana, 'Ylli i Kuq Durrës' is KS Teuta Durrës and 'Dinamo Korça' is Skënderbeu

Group B

Note: 'Bashkimi Elbasanas' is KS Elbasani, 'Shqiponja' is Luftëtari, '8 Nëntori' is Erzeni, 'Traktori' is KS Lushnja and 'Spartak Kuçova' is Naftëtari

Final

Interrupted Championship 1948-49
In 1948 the AFA decided to employ a new formula for  the championship, according to the 'western' calendar. For the first time in history, Albania's championship style would be compared to that of Western European countries, from autumn 1948-spring 1949; but on 31 March 1949, the Federata Sportive Shqiptare (Albanian Sports Federation) annulled the 1948-49 season under Soviet pressure. After disassociating itself from all Soviet influences (3 December 1961), Albania started a fall/spring season from 1962/63 on.

Table at abandonment:

NB: apart from the last round, the matches Korça vs Kavaja and Korça vs Shkodra were not played.

All the police (Dinamo) and trade union (Spartaku) clubs changed their name to simply the town name, apart from Partizani and Dinamo Tirana.

References

External links
Albania - List of final tables (RSSSF)

Kategoria Superiore seasons
1
Albania
Albania